{{DISPLAYTITLE:C22H23O11}}
The molecular formula C22H23O11, molarMass = 463.41 g/mol (Aglycone), exact mass : 463.124036578 u (C22H23O11+ (aglycone), C22H23O11Cl (chloride), 498.9 g/mol (chloride)) may refer to:
 Peonidin-3-O-glucoside
 Pulchellidin 3-rhamnoside